I'm Fed Up may refer to:

I'm Fed Up, biography of Edoardo Bennato 
"I'm Fed Up", song by Ike and Tina Turner 
I'm Fed Up! (Alizée song) (French title: J'en ai marre!)